Más (More) is the fifth studio album recorded by Spanish singer-songwriter Alejandro Sanz, It was released by WEA Latina on 9 September 1997 (see 1997 in music). With sales of over two million copies, it is the best-selling album of all time in Spain.

Track listing

Re-release 
Más (Edición 2006) is the re-release of the album Más containing a CD and DVD. The CD contains 13 tracks and the DVD contains 15 videos.

Track listing

CD 
  – 5:22
  – 5:04
  – 5:46
  – 4:48
  – 4:52
  – 5:09
  – 4:50
  – 4:47
  – 5:36
  – 4:44
  – 4:11
  – 4:41
  – 5:22

DVD

Personnel
Adapted from the Más liner notes:

Performance credits

Musicians

Lele Melotti – drums 
Elio Rivagli – drums 
Paolo Costa – bass 
Alberto Paixao – bass 
Saverlo Porciello – acoustic guitar 
Joan Bibiloni – acoustic guitar 
Ludovico Vagnone – electric guitar 
Alejandro Sanz – Spanish guitar 
Vicente Amigo – Spanish guitar 
Emanuele Ruffinengo – piano, keyboards, programming 
Roberto Manzin – saxophone 
Rubem Dantas – percussion 
Seydu – percussion 
Lulo Pérez – percussion, trumpet, flugelhorn 
Sergio Lavandera – saxophone 
Lázaro Ordóñez – trombone 
Luca Jurman – chorus 
Elena Roggero – chorus 
Paola Repele – chorus 
Mayte Pizarro – chorus 
Eva Durán – chorus 
Pedro Sánchez – chorus 

Grupo Folclórico del Coro del Valle – chorus 
Enrique "Quique" Ansino
J. María de Apiazu
Israel Ceca
Pablo Francés
Miguel García
Rubén García
J. Miguel "Chemi" Ginés
Manuel González
J. Domingo López
Antíoco Llanos
Oliver Luna
Juan Mínguez

Technical credits

Emanuele Ruffinengo – producer, arrangements, choir arrangements, brass arrangements 
Miguel Ángel Arenas – producer
Pedro Miguel Ledo – production assistant
Alejandro Sanz – musical concept
Lulo Pérez – brass arrangements 
Luca Jurman – choir arrangements
Jesús Ugalde – photography
Jesús López – photography assistant
Juanjo Mánez – styling
Lola López – styling assistant
Yolanda López – make-up
Javier Cofiño – hairdressing
Rafael Sañudo – art direction, art design
David Quiles – image treatment
Luca Vittori – recording engineer
Fabrizio Facioni – recording engineer
Nino Giuffrida – recording engineer
Giamba Lizzori – recording engineer
Juan Vinader – recording engineer
Oscar Claver – recording engineer
Renato Cantele – mixing engineer
Maurizio Biancani – mixing engineer
Antonio Baglio – mastering engineer

Recording, mixing and mastering locations

Excalibur (Milan) – recording
Plastic (Rome) – recording
Morning (Milan) – recording, mixing 
Logic (Milan) – mixing 
Red Led (Madrid) – additional recordings
Sintonía (Madrid) – additional recordings
Nautilus (Milan) – mastering

Charts

Weekly charts

Monthly charts

Year-end charts

Sales and certifications

See also 
 List of best-selling albums in Argentina
 List of best-selling albums in Spain
 List of best-selling Latin albums

References 

1997 albums
Alejandro Sanz albums
1997 video albums
1997 live albums
Live video albums
Music video compilation albums
1997 compilation albums
Warner Music Latina albums
Spanish-language albums